Mahatma Jyotiba Phule Rohilkhand University (MJP Rohilkhand University) is a government university in Uttar Pradesh, India and campus spread over . It is an ISO9001:2015 Certified U.P. Government University. The university headquarters is in Bareilly with territorial jurisdiction extending over the districts of Bareilly, Moradabad, Sambhal, Rampur, Bijnore, Amroha, Budaun, Pilibhit and Shahjahanpur.The administrative block is on the outskirts of Bareilly city along Pilibhit bypass road.

History 

The university was established in 1975 as Rohilkhand University, and was renamed as Mahatma Jyotiba Phule Rohilkhand University in August 1997 in honour of social reformer Mahatma Jyotiba Phule.

Notable alumni
Santosh Gangwar, Chairperson, Committee on Public Undertakings
Salona Kushwaha, Politician 
Mohammed Shami, cricketer
Rajpal Yadav, film actor
Y. D. Sharma, professor
Rahul Johri, executive
Vinod Kapri, film maker

See also
List of universities in India
 University Grants Commission (India)
 All India Council for Technical Education (AICTE)
 Distance Education Council (DEC)
 Education in India
 Government Degree College Sambhal

References

External links
M. J. P. Rohilkhand University official webpage
 U.P State Council Of Higher Education / NAAC / NAAC Accreditation Status of College, University

Universities in Uttar Pradesh
Education in Bareilly
Buildings and structures in Bareilly
Educational institutions established in 1975
1975 establishments in Uttar Pradesh
Jyotirao Phule
Rohilkhand